Lachesis muta, also known as the Southern American bushmaster or Atlantic bushmaster, is a venomous pit viper species found in South America, as well as the island of Trinidad in the Caribbean. Two subspecies are currently recognized, including the nominate subspecies described here.

Taxonomy
Two additional subspecies, L. m. melanocephala and L. m. stenophrys, had earlier been recognized. However, both were elevated to species level by Zamudio and Green in 1997 (see L. melanocephala and L. stenophrys).

Subspecies

Description
Adults grow to an average of 2 to 2.5 m (6½-8 feet), although 3 m (10 feet) is not too unusual. The largest recorded specimen was 3.65 m (almost 12 feet) long, making the species the largest of all vipers and the longest venomous snake in the Western Hemisphere. Lachesis muta is the third longest venomous snake in the world, exceeded in length only by the king cobra and the black mamba.

The head is broad and distinct from the narrow neck. The snout is broadly rounded. There is no canthus. A pair of small internasals is present, separated by small scales. The supraoculars are narrow. Other parts of the crown are covered with very small scales. Laterally, the second supralabial forms the anterior border of the loreal pit, while the third is very large. The eye is separated from the supralabials by 4-5 rows of small scales.

The body is cylindrical, tapered and moderately stout. Midbody there are 31-37 nonoblique rows of dorsal scales which are heavily keeled with bulbous tubercles and feebly imbricate. There are 200-230 ventral scales. The tail is short with 32-50 mainly paired subcaudals, followed by 13-17 rows of small spines and a terminal spine. Like most New World pit vipers, Lachesis muta exhibits defensive tail vibration behavior in response to potential predatory threats

The color pattern consists of a yellowish, reddish or grey-brown ground color, overlaid with a series of dark brown or black dorsal blotches that form lateral inverted triangles of the same color. The lateral pattern may be precisely or indistinctly defined, normally pale at the center.

Venom

Some reports suggest that this species produces a large amount of venom that is weak compared to some other vipers. Others, however, suggest that such conclusions are not accurate. These animals are badly affected by stress and rarely live long in captivity. This makes it difficult to obtain venom in useful quantities and good condition for study purposes. For example, Bolaños (1972) observed that venom yield from his specimens fell from 233 mg to 64 mg while they remained in his care. As the stress of being milked regularly has this effect on venom yield, it is reasoned that it may also affect venom toxicity. This may explain the disparity described by Hardy and Haad (1998) between the low laboratory toxicity of the venom and the high mortality rate of bite victims.

Brown (1973) gives the following  values for mice: 1.5 mg/kg IV, 1.6–6.2 mg/kg IP, 6.0 mg/kg SC. He also notes a venom yield of 200–411 mg. The bushmaster's venom has proteolytic activity, which destroys and causes lesions in the tissue, anti-coagulant, which causes incoagulable blood, hemorrhagic and neurotoxic, that acts mainly on vagal stimulation. The symptoms are quite similar to those caused by Bothrops, at the site of the bite there is pain, edema, ecchymosis, skin necrosis, abscesses, vesicles and blisters. The main complications at the bite site include necrosis, compartment syndrome, secondary infections and functional deficit. The systemic effects are characterized by hypotension, dizziness, visual disturbances, bradycardia, abdominal pain, nausea, vomiting and diarrhea. Other manifestations are also similar to Bothrops, including systemic hemorrhage and kidney failure. In ilhéus, Bahia, Brazil, a 7-year-old boy was bitten when he left the house and stepped on one of these specimens, which then readily bit him; death was reported to have occurred approximately 15 minutes later. In 2005, in northwest Mato Grosso, a 5-year-old child also died, going into shock approximately 30 minutes after being bitten by a Lachesis muta and succumbing within 90 minutes.

Etymology
Lachesis is one of the three Fates in Greek mythology and was supposed to assign to man his term of life—something this species is certainly capable of doing. The species is similar in appearance to rattlesnakes and vibrates its tail vigorously when alarmed, but has no rattle and was therefore called mutus (later muta), which is Latin for "dumb" or "mute". However, when in the undergrowth, the tail actually makes quite a loud rustling noise.

Common names
Known as the mapepire zanana or mapepire grande (pronounced ma-pa(y)-PEE za-Na-na or ma-pa(Y)-PEE GRAN-dey) in Trinidad, surucucú in the Amazon Basin (surucucu in a large part of Brazil), shushúpe in Peru, and pucarara in Bolivia.  In Venezuela the species is known as cuaima or cuaima piña. In Colombia it is known as verrugosa or verrugoso due to the warty look of its scales, and in Suriname as makasneki and makkaslang. 

It is called ĩtsãi in the Kwaza language of Rondônia, Brazil.

In the Shawi language of Peru, it is called na’shi.

Distribution and habitat
L. muta is found in South America in the equatorial forests east of the Andes, and the island of Trinidad. The type locality is "Surinami" (Suriname). It occurs in primary and secondary forests; adjacent fields and cleared areas. In Trinidad it tends to prefer hilly and mountainous regions.

Diet
Bushmasters prey primarily on rats and mice. Birds and reptiles may occasionally be eaten. Spiny rats are favored prey items in Costa Rica. Rice rats and agoutis are other favored prey. Other prey items include porcupines, squirrels, opossums, squirrel monkeys, and frogs.

References

Further reading

Bolaños R (1972). "Toxicity of Costa Rican snake venoms for the white mouse". American Jour. Trop. Med. Hyg. 21: 360–363.
Hardy DL Sr, Haad JJS (1998). "A review of venom toxinology and epidemiology of envenoming of the bushmaster (Lachesis) with report of a fatal bite". Bull. Chicago Herp. Soc. 33(6): 113–123.
Linnaeus C (1766). Systema naturæ per regna tria naturæ, secundum classes, ordines, genera, species, cum characteribus, differentiis, synonymis, locis. Tomus I. Editio Duodecima, Reformata [Part 1. Twelfth Edition, Revised]. Stockholm: L. Salvius. 532 pp. (Crotalus mutus, new species, p. 373). (in Latin).
O'Shea M (2005). Venomous Snakes of the World. Princeton, New Jersey: Princeton University Press. 160 pp. .
Zamudio KR, Greene HW (1997). "Phylogeography of the bushmaster (Lachesis muta: Viperidae): implications for neotropical biogeography, systematics and conservation". Biological Journal of the Linnean Society 62: 421–442. PDF at Cornell University, Department of Ecology and Evolutionary Biology. Accessed 26 October 2006.

External links

 
 Ripa Ecologica. Accessed 26 October 2006.

muta
Reptiles of Guyana
Reptiles of Brazil
Reptiles of Ecuador
Reptiles of Peru
Reptiles of Bolivia
Reptiles of Venezuela
Reptiles of Suriname
Reptiles of French Guiana
Reptiles of Trinidad and Tobago
Reptiles of Colombia
Snakes of the Caribbean
Taxa named by Carl Linnaeus
Venomous snakes
Reptiles described in 1766